Constitutional Assembly elections were held in Colombia on 9 December 1990 alongside a referendum on the Assembly itself. The Assembly sat from February to July 1991 and drew up the 1991 constitution.

Background
After the murder of presidential candidate Luis Carlos Galán in August 1989, students started a movement calling for a referendum "for peace and democracy" to be held on 21 January 1990. However, under pressure from drug cartels, the government rejected the proposal. The students then set up the "We can still save Colombia" movement, which called for a referendum alongside the general elections on 11 March 1990 on establishing a Constitutional Assembly. The referendum saw 2,235,493 voted in favour and 117,000 vote against.

Following the unofficial referendum, President Virgilio Barco Vargas issued decree 927 on 3 May calling a referendum on electing a Constitutional Assembly alongside the presidential elections on 27 May. Although this was in violation of article 218 of the constitution, which gave Congress sole rights to reform the constitution, the referendum was approved by the Supreme Court.

After 95% of voters approved of the election of the Assembly, elections were set for December. However, new President César Gaviria chose to reinforce the legitimacy of the Assembly by holding a second referendum on its election. Only those who voted "yes" in the referendum could then cast a vote for the Assembly.

The Assembly was elected by proportional representation in a single nationwide constituency.

Results

Constitutional Assembly

Following the elections, four seats were given to guerrilla groups; two to the Popular Liberation Army, one to the Movimiento Armado Quintin Lame and one to the Workers Revolutionary Party.

Referendum

References

Elections in Colombia
Referendums in Colombia
1990 in Colombia
Colombia
Colombia